Somewhere in My Heart is a 2009 Philippine television drama romantic comedy series and serves as the third installment of the Precious Hearts Romances Presents series. The third installment got positive and rave reviews due to the launching loveteam Kaye Abad and Guji Lorenzana. The series aired on ABS-CBN's Hapontastic afternoon block from October 19, 2009 to December 4, 2009.

Plot 
The story revolves on two different characters Femi (Kaye Abad) and Aaron (Guji Lorenzana), the two college well-known people of their school. It revolves on these two main protagonists; Femi, a free-spirited young female whose liberated lifestyle is the only way to pave a good life and unfortunately give positivity, and Aaron on the other hand, is from a rich family whose father pushes him to work for the family business but his creative passion is art. Femi tries her best to get Aaron's attention even seducing him but Aaron knows how Femi is. These two unlike personalities who meet an unlikely attraction ensues. But when Aaron dumps Femi, Femi leaves the college in order to let go of this dilemma and heartbreak and humiliation she has suffered. 10 years later as all else failed, she lives in the present its 2009, and she is a hairstylist, but still up to her old ways now she has to lie that she is a nun, in order for Aaron to leave her alone. Will Femi learn her lesson on lying and trust?

Cast and characters

Main cast
Kaye Abad as Eufemia ‘Femi’ Dalisay - With her free spirited character, Femi is often perceived by people as a liberated woman. She is determined to try out every available means of livelihood so she can provide for her family. Femi has decided to set aside her love life, but everything will change when she meets the campus heartthrob Aaron.
Guji Lorenzana as Aaron Gorospe - Born into a rich family, Aaron is taking up a Business Management course because his father wants him to be in charge of their business in the future. However, he has a different dream for himself. Good looking, quiet, and mysterious, Aaron is the heartthrob of the campus. In spite having an easy time with the girls, he is looking for the ‘one’ who will love him for who he really is.

Supporting cast
Mat Ranillo III as Arnulfo Gorospe
Gillete Sandico as Trina Gorospe
Nikki Valdez as Amanda
Ahron Villena as Crispollo/Justin Rodriguez
Erika Padilla as Amy
Lloyd Zaragoza as Bogs
Luane Dy as Andrea Cusi
Princess Ryan as Denise Silva
Niña Dolino as Annette Gorospe
Nicole Uysiuseng as Myra
Malou Crisologo as Mother Prioress
Debra Liz as Sister Stella
Beauty Gonzalez as Sister Claire

Guest Cast
Yayo Aguila as Michelle Dalisay
Neil Ryan Sese as Father of Menggay
Krista Ranillo as Mother of Menggay
Tiya Pusit as Petra Mirafuentes
Angelo Garcia as Jon-Jon
Amy Nobleza as Ben-Ben
Nikki Samonte as Menggay
Kristel Moreno as Paula
Mark Manicad as Basil
Dyaz Min Ramirez as Mia
Kenny Santos as Amy's boyfriend
Toffi Santos as Bogs' boyfriend
Anthony Ramirez as Frank Muñoz
Julio Sampafer as Charles

See also
List of shows previously aired by ABS-CBN
Precious Hearts Romances Presents

References

ABS-CBN drama series
2009 Philippine television series debuts
2009 Philippine television series endings
Philippine romantic comedy television series
Television shows based on books
Filipino-language television shows
Television shows set in the Philippines